The 1983 San Diego Chargers season was the franchise's 14th season in the National Football League (NFL) and its 24th overall. The Chargers fell from their 1982 6–3 record to 6–10. It was their first losing season since 1976, to date the most points the Chargers have surrendered in a sixteen-game season, and began an era in the wilderness for the Chargers, who would not place higher than third in the AFC West, nor win more than eight games in a season, until 1992.

Despite San Diego's disappointing 6–10 record, they led the NFL in passing yardage for the sixth consecutive season, which remains an NFL record.

This was the last season for the Chargers before Gene Klein; the team's owner since 1966, sold the team to Alex Spanos.

Roster

Schedule

Note: Intra-division opponents are in bold text.

Standings

Game summaries

Week 5: New York Giants

Gill Byrd had an interception for San Diego.

References

External links
1983 San Diego Chargers at pro-football-reference.com

San Diego Chargers
San Diego Chargers seasons
San Diego Chargers f